Aurelia Del Carmen Guarini  (born 18 January 1953) is an Argentine anthropologist, teacher, film director, and film producer specializing in anthropological documentary films. 
She teaches visual anthropology and directs documentaries in Argentina (Fundación Universidad del Cine; University of Buenos Aires; Observatorio Escuela de Cine Documental) and in Cuba. She serves on the documentary projects' evaluation committee at the National Institute of Cinema and Audiovisual Arts and participates in Cine Ojo projects.

Biography
Guarini earned her Ph.D. at the Paris West University Nanterre La Défense. She studied anthropological film under the direction of Jean Rouch in 1988 and had specialized seminars with Fernando Birri, Jean Louis Comolli, and Jorge Prelorán. She is a researcher at CONICET, and professor of Visual Anthropology at the University of Buenos Aires. She also teaches courses at the Film Centre and the International Film and Television School, a school of audiovisual media in San Antonio de los Baños, Cuba, and has been a Visiting Professor in France and Spain. With Marcelo Céspedes, she founded the production company Cine Ojo (1986) and the Festival y Forum DocBuenosAires (2001). She worked as a producer with many Argentine directors, including Andrés Di Tella, Mouján Alejandro Fernandez, Pedro Fernandez Mouján, Jorge Goldenberg, Edgardo Cozarinsky, Cristian Pauls, and Sergio Wolf. For her work in film, Guarini has won prizes at major national and international festivals.

Filmography

Director
 Walsh entre todos  (2015)
 Calles de la memoria  (2012)
 D-Humanos ("Baldosas en Buenos Aires"), (2011)
 Gorri  (2010)
 Meykinof  (2005)
 El diablo entre las flores  (short film) (2004)
 H.I.J.O.S., el alma en dos  (2002)
 Compañero Birri)  (unpublished) (2001)
 Tinta roja  (1998)
 Jaime de Nevares: Último viaje  (1995)  
 En el nombre de la seguridad nacional  (1994)
 Historias de amores semanales  (1993)
 La voz de los pañuelos (short film)  (1992)
 La noche eterna  (1991)
  A los compañeros la libertad  (short film) (1987)
 Buenos Aires, crónicas villeras  (1986)

Production
 Walsh entre todos  (2015)
 Calles de la memoria  (2012)
 Gorri  (2010)
 Madres con ruedas  (2006)
 Los perros  (2004)
 La televisión y yo (notas en una libreta)  (2002)
 Por la vuelta  (2002)
 El siglo del viento  (1999)
 Buenos Aires, crónicas villeras  (1986)

Executive producer
 Walsh entre todos  (2015) 
 Saldaño. El sueño dorado  (2014)
 Sangre de mi sangre  (2014)
 Regreso a Fortín Olmos  (2008)
 Pulqui, un instante en la patria de la felicidad  (2007)
 Fotografías  (2007)
 Bialet Massé, un siglo después  (2006)
 Murgas y murgueros  (2003)
 El tiempo y la sangre  (2004)
 Prohibido dormir  (2004)
 Yo no sé qué me han hecho tus ojos  (2003)
 H.I.J.O.S., el alma en dos  (2002)
 Tango deseo (short film)  (2002)
 Yo, Sor Alice  (2001)

Associate producer
 Liniers, el trazo simple de las cosas  (2010)

Production management
 Ronda nocturna  (2005)

Camera
 Walsh entre todos  (2015)
 Calles de la memoria  (2012)
 H.I.J.O.S., el alma en dos  (2002)

Sound
 La voz de los pañuelos (short film)  (1992)

Screenwriter
 Walsh entre todos  (2015)
 Calles de la memoria  (2012)
 Cuentas del alma. Confesiones de una guerrillera  (2012)
 Gorri  (2010)
 Meykinof  (2005)
 H.I.J.O.S., el alma en dos  (2002)
 Tinta roja  (1998)
 Jaime de Nevares: Último viaje  (1995)  
 Historias de amores semanales  (1993)
 A los compañeros la libertad  (short film) (1987)
 Hospital Borda: un llamado a la razón  (1986)
 Buenos Aires, crónicas villeras  (1986)

Photography
 Walsh entre todos  (2015)
 Calles de la memoria  (2012)
 Gorri  (2010)
 Meykinof  (2005)
 Por la vuelta  (2002)
 H.I.J.O.S., el alma en dos  (2002)

Montage
 Walsh entre todos  (2015)
 Madres con ruedas  (2006)
 Por la vuelta  (2002)
 H.I.J.O.S., el alma en dos  (2002)
 Tinta roja  (1998)

Text
 Calles de la memoria  (2012)
 Jaime de Nevares: Último viaje  (1995)

Creation
 Ronda nocturna  (2005)

Art direction
 Espejo para cuando me pruebe el smoking  (2005)

Awards

 1995, Special mention, Organización Católica Internacional del Cine
 2000, Special mention, Festival Internacional de cine documental, cortometrajes y animación, Bombay, India
 2001, Konex Award
 2002, Special mention, Havana Film Festival
 2006, candidate, Argentine Film Critics Association
 2011, Konex Award
 Special mention, FIPRESCI

References

Bibliography

External links

Living people
1953 births
Argentine anthropologists
Argentine women anthropologists
Argentine film directors
Argentine women film directors
Women academics
Academic staff of the University of Buenos Aires
Argentine screenwriters
Women screenwriters
Visual anthropologists
University of Paris alumni